This is a list of mayors of New Castle, Indiana.

Sources 
 Ratcliff, Richard Pickering (1999). Henry County At The Millennium: A Reference Book of History, Firsts, Trivia, Lists and Interesting Facts. New Castle, Indiana:Henry County Historical Society.

New Castle, Indiana
New Castle, Indiana